Gunnar Jordfald (born 4 May 1946) is a Norwegian civil servant.

He graduated as a siv.ing from the Norwegian Institute of Technology.  He was acting director of the Norwegian Pollution Control Authority from 1990 to 1992, director of the now-defunct Norwegian Food Control Authority from 1998 to 2003 and director of the Norwegian Institute for Air Research since 2003.  He has also worked for Norges Teknisk-Naturvitenskapelige Forskningsråd and the United Nations Environment Programme.

References

1946 births
Living people
Directors of government agencies of Norway
Norwegian civil servants
Norwegian engineers
Norwegian Institute of Technology alumni